Lotta Dahlberg (born 9 October 1962) is a Swedish luger. She competed in the women's singles event at the 1984 Winter Olympics.

References

External links
 

1962 births
Living people
Swedish female lugers
Olympic lugers of Sweden
Lugers at the 1984 Winter Olympics
Sportspeople from Stockholm
20th-century Swedish women